Aline Milene de Lima (born 8 April 1994), known in Brazil as Aline Milene, is a Brazilian footballer who plays as a midfielder for Associação Ferroviária de Esportes and the Brazil women's national team.

College career
De Lima moved to the United States and attended the Northwest College, the Monroe College and the Baylor University.

International goals
Scores and results list Brazil's goal tally first

Honours

National team
 Copa América Femenina: 2018

References

External links

1994 births
Living people
Women's association football midfielders
Brazilian women's footballers
Footballers from Belo Horizonte
Brazil women's international footballers
Baylor Bears women's soccer players
Associação Ferroviária de Esportes (women) players
Brazilian expatriate women's footballers
Brazilian expatriate sportspeople in the United States
Expatriate women's soccer players in the United States